{{Infobox Twitch streamer
| name = Disguised Toast
| logo = 
| logo_size = 
| logo_caption = 
| image = Disguised_Toast_2021.jpg
| image_size = 
| caption = Wang in 2021
| birth_name = Jeremy Wang
| birth_date = 
| birth_place = Taipei, Taiwan
| nationality = Canadian • Taiwanese
| education = University of Waterloo
| location = Los Angeles, California
| home_town = Kingston, Ontario, Canada • Penang, Malaysia
| occupation = 
| website = 
| pseudonym = 
| channel_name = DisguisedToast
| years_active = 2015–2019, 2021–present (Twitch)2019–2021 (Facebook Gaming)
| genre = Gaming
| games = {{flatlist| Hearthstone  Teamfight Tactics  League of Legends  Among Us}}
| followers = 2.7 million
| views = 90.2 million
| associated_acts = 
| stats_update = 6 Nov 2022
| module = 
}}
Jeremy Wang (born 25 November 1991), better known as Disguised Toast, is a Taiwanese-Canadian streamer, YouTuber, and Internet personality. He got his start on YouTube, creating videos about the digital card game Hearthstone. Wang later began streaming on Twitch, before signing an exclusive streaming contract with Facebook Gaming in November 2019. In November 2021, Wang announced his return to streaming on Twitch.

Wang is a member of OfflineTV, an online social entertainment group of content creators.

 Personal life 
Wang was born in Taiwan, but his family moved to Penang, Malaysia before he turned one. Wang's older brother later moved to Canada to attend university, with the rest of his family moving over later, settling in Kingston, Ontario. In 2013, he received his 3-year degree in mathematics from the University of Waterloo after initially majoring in computer science.

Before starting his streaming career, he worked as an app developer for Mercedes Benz, the NFL, the Royal Bank of Canada, and Zynga.

 Streaming career 
In 2015, Wang began making infographics and YouTube videos in which he showcased unusual card interactions in Hearthstone, shared on the community aggregation site Reddit. Wang covered his face with a toast-shaped cardboard mask until he revealed his face by mistake in October 2016. Wang's username and toast-mask are a reference to a Hearthstone card, SI:7 Agent. When played in-game, the voice line for the card reads “This guy's toast”. Comedian Conan O'Brien called it “the greatest name in gaming history.”

In March 2017, Wang competed in the ONOG Major Circuit at PAX East. Despite making it into the top 32, he overslept the following morning and was disqualified.

In June 2017, Wang was temporarily banned from Hearthstone for 72 hours in response to an instance in which he showcased an exploit on stream.

It was announced in October 2017 that Wang had joined OfflineTV, a collective of content creators living together in Los Angeles, California.

Wang became known for his Hearthstone streams. In the summer of 2019, he gained a huge following while streaming Riot Games' new game Teamfight Tactics, and another spike during the test phase of Riot's upcoming card game, Legends of Runeterra. During that time, he was the second most-watched streamer on Twitch. By that time, he had 1.3 million followers on Twitch and 950,000 subscribers on his main YouTube channel. In November 2019, Wang signed an exclusive deal with Facebook to move from Twitch to Facebook Gaming for his gaming streams.

In May 2019, Wang was nominated as Twitch Streamer of the Year in the 11th annual Shorty Awards.

In late 2019, Wang turned down an offer from Blizzard in which he was asked to reveal a new card from the Saviors of Uldum expansion, citing his personal feelings on Hearthstone as well as negative community reaction.

In April 2020, Wang returned to Twitch to host a new non-gaming series called “Blind eDating”. The series focuses on dating a new girl each week and playing games with them.

Between September 2020 and January 2021, Wang received an influx of more than two million subscribers and 400 million video views on YouTube as a result of a number of his videos based on the game Among Us trending. He has played with a number of notable Twitch streamers, YouTubers, and celebrities in these videos, including PewDiePie, JackSepticEye, Pokimane, Jae Park, Logic, James Charles, Bretman Rock, and Mark Tuan. In late October, Wang participated in an Among Us session on Twitch featuring Democratic politicians Alexandria Ocasio-Cortez and Ilhan Omar to advocate for voting in the 2020 United States presidential election.

On August 12, 2021, Wang starred in the music video for Sub Urban and Bella Poarch's song, “Inferno”. 

On November 17, 2021, Wang announced his departure from Facebook Gaming after two years on the platform. A week later on November 24, Wang announced that he would be returning to Twitch.

On January 10, 2022, Wang's Twitch account was suspended for 48 hours for watching the anime Death Note'' on stream.

Filmography

Music videos

Achievements

Notable tournament placements

Awards and nominations

See also
 List of University of Waterloo people
 Taiwanese Canadians

References

External links

Living people
1991 births
Taiwanese emigrants to Canada
University of Waterloo alumni
Twitch (service) streamers
Canadian YouTubers
Gaming YouTubers
Hearthstone players
Streamer Award winners